World2Fly Portugal is a Portuguese passenger charter airline from Portugal and a subsidiary of Spanish airline World2Fly.

History
The airline was established in 2021 to operate flights between Portugal and destinations mainly in the Caribbean. It is the subsidiary of Spanish airline World2Fly, which is owned by the Iberostar Group. The airline began operating during the 2022 summer season out of Lisbon Airport, using an Airbus A330-300. The airline flies charter flights to destinations including Cancún and Punta Cana.

Destinations
World2Fly Portugal currently operates charter flights out of Lisbon to several destinations mainly in the Caribbean.

Fleet

, the World2Fly Portugal fleet includes the following aircraft:

See also
List of airlines of Portugal

References

Airlines of Portugal
Airlines established in 2021